Kerstin Elizabeth Hilldén (born 22 June 1988) is a Swedish singer and actress.

Early life and education 
Kerstin Elizabeth Hilldén was born at Mölndal Hospital in Mölndal on 22 June 1988, the second child to Arne Hilldén, a doctor in geology, and Mary-Ann Hopkins, a music and mathematics teacher. She is the younger sister of Johan Hilldén who was born in 1986, both siblings grew up in Mölnlycke, about 10 km (6.2 miles) from Gothenburg. Hilldén's maternal grandparents, Mary & George Hopkins, were both singers in a church choir in Karlskrona, Blekinge. George Hopkins was of English origin while Mary was born in Jämtland.

As a child, Hilldén had already been on scene at the Gothenburg Opera.

In 2015, Hilldén was accepted into the Royal Academy of Music in London.

Career 
Hilldén's first musical was the adaptation of Victor Hugo's Les Misérables, which was played in Swedish at the Wermland Opera in 2016. Hilldén played the role of Eponine which she described as "one of [her] favourite characters along with Javert and Valjean". She further stated that Eponine was a character with "which [she] could identify [herself] with".

Hilldén has played major roles in other musicals such as "Sophia" in Sound of Music, "Miss Honey" in the musical adaptation of Roald Dahl's novel Matilda, and Cabaret based on the 1966 musical of the same name. Sound of Music and Matilda were both played at the Malmö Opera, however Cabaret debuted on 2 October 2022 at the Gothenburg Opera.

Hilldén has also played minor parts/roles in several other musicals such as Festkväll at the Gothenburg Opera, A Talent To Amuse at St. James Theatre, and Curtain Up! Prince of Wales Theatre.

In 2020, she was part of a group of members of the Gothenburg Opera to participate and performed at Lotta på Liseberg.

Personal life 
Hilldén is in a relationship with fellow musical actor Isak Bendelin.

References 

1988 births
Living people
People from Mölnlycke
Swedish musicians
Swedish singers
Swedish women singers
Alumni of the Royal Academy of Music
Swedish actresses
Swedish musical theatre actresses
Swedish people of English descent